The 19th Miss Lithuania 2010 pageant was held on August 27, 2010. This year only 20 candidates are competing for the national crown. The chosen winner represented Lithuania at the  Miss World 2010. Contest started with 40 participants and at the final there left only 14 contestants.

Final Results

Special Awards
 Miss Public - Gritė Maruškevičiūtė (Vilnius)
 Miss Elegance - Sandra Lukšytė (Vilnius)
 Miss Photo - Elona Račkutė (Kaunas)

Jury 
Benas Gudelis, organizer and „KristiAna“ delegate
Dalia Michelevičiūtė, actress
Kęstutis Rimdžius, stylist and TV presenter
Vaida Kursevičienė, Missis Lithuania 2010
Raimundas Adžgauskas, photographer

Candidates

References
 Miss Lithuania official website

2010 in Lithuania
Beauty pageants in Lithuania
2010 beauty pageants
Events in Vilnius